Lady Helena Emily Gleichen OBE DStJ (1 February, 1873– 28 January, 1947) was a British painter of landscapes, flowers, and animals, with a particular passion for horses. During World War I, she served as an ambulance driver and radiographer in France and Italy, where she was given the rank of major in the army. Her awards for her services included the Order of the British Empire.

Family and early life
Her brother, Lord Edward Gleichen (1863–1937), a professional soldier, wrote several books. Her sister, Lady Feodora Gleichen (1861–1922) was a sculptor. They were the children of Count Victor von Gleichen aka Prince Victor of Hohenlohe-Langenburg, a half-nephew of Queen Victoria and himself a sculptor and naval officer, and his morganatic wife Laura Williamina Seymour, a daughter of Admiral Sir George Seymour.

On 15 December 1885, the Court Circular announced the Queen's permission for Helena's mother to share her father's rank at the Court of St James's, and henceforth they were known as TSH Prince and Princess Victor of Hohenlohe-Langenburg. But the Queen did not extend that privilege to their children, although she confirmed use of their German style as count and countesses. On 12 June 1913 Helena and her sisters, the Countesses Feodora and Valda Gleichen, were granted precedence before the daughters of dukes in the peerage of England.

Gleichen was educated privately, then studied in Rollshoven and at Frank Calderon's School of Animal Painting. She also studied under Frank Brangwyn and Arthur Lemon, who both greatly influenced her work. She helped with illustrations for the Younghusband Expedition to Tibet in 1904.

World War I
When World War I began, Gleichen volunteered as an ambulance driver and translator at a British hospital in France. At the suggestion of a French surgeon, she and her girlfriend Nina Hollings studied radiography in Paris and London. After being rebuffed by the British and French War Offices, they went to Italy, where they were given the rank of major in the Italian Army.

Gleichen headed the 4th Radiographic British Red Cross Unit stationed in the Villa Zucco in Cormons, Italy. She later received the Italian Bronze Medal of Military Valour and was invested as a Dame of Grace of the Order of St John of Jerusalem and as an officer, OBE in 1920. She was a Fellow of the Society of Antiquaries. In early 1918, she abandoned her German titles, accepting demotion by the King to the style and rank of a marquess's daughter.

Later life and death
Gleichen worked from her father's former studio in St James's Palace opposite Friary Court. The family home was a rambling estate called Hellens Manor at Much Marcle in Herefordshire, which was used during World War II by the Tate Gallery for the safe storage of art works. During the war, Gleichen organised her estate staff of some 80 men into a private army, whom she taught military tactics and shooting.

Her memoir, Contacts and Contrasts, illustrated with reproductions of her paintings, was published in 1940. She died in 1947, three days before her 74th birthday. A memorial plaque to her and her siblings is located at Golders Green Crematorium.

Ancestry

References

Further reading 
 Helena Gleichen, Contacts and Contrasts (1940). Reprinted, with a new Introduction by Caroline Stone (Mansion Field, 2013).
 

1873 births
1947 deaths
19th-century English people
19th-century English women
20th-century English painters
20th-century English women artists
20th-century English memoirists
20th-century English women writers
British women memoirists
English women painters
British people of German descent
Dames of Grace of the Order of St John
Daughters of British marquesses
House of Hohenlohe-Langenburg
Officers of the Order of the British Empire
Painters from London
Place of death missing
Recipients of the Bronze Medal of Military Valor
Sibling artists
British women in World War I
Radiographers
Italian Army personnel